Merlinda Bobis (born 25 November 1959) is a contemporary Filipina-Australian writer and academic.

Biography
Born in Legazpi City, in the Philippines province of Albay, Merlinda Bobis attended Bicol University High School then completed her B.A. at Aquinas University in Legazpi City. She holds post-graduate degrees from the University of Santo Tomas and University of Wollongong, and now lives in Australia. Written in various genres in both Filipino and English, her work integrates elements of the traditional culture of the Philippines with modern immigrant experience.

Also a dancer and visual artist, Bobis currently teaches at Wollongong University. Her play Rita's Lullaby was the winner of the 1998 Awgie for Best Radio Play and the international Prix Italia of the same year; in 2000 White Turtle won the Steele Rudd Award for the Best Collection of Australian Short Stories and the 2000 Philippine National Book Award. Most recently, in 2006, she has received the Gintong Aklat Award (Golden Book Award, Philippines) for her novel Banana Heart Summer, from the Book Development Association of the Philippines. Bobis won the 2016 Christina Stead Prize for Fiction and NSW Premier's Literary Awards for her book, Locust Girl: A Lovesong.

Work

Poetry
Rituals: Selected poems, 1985-1990. (1990)
Summer was a Fast Train without Terminals. (Melbourne: Spinifex, 1998) 
 usaping ina at anak
Accidents of Composition (Melbourne: Spinifex, 2017)

Short stories
White Turtle. (Melbourne: Spinifex, 1999)  review
The Kissing (Aunt Lute, 2001)  [US reissue of White Turtle] review

Novels

 Banana Heart Summer (Murdoch Books, 2005) 
 The Solemn Lantern Maker (Sydney: Murdoch Books, 2008)
 Fish-hair Woman (North Melbourne: Spinifex, 2011)
 Locust Girl: A Lovesong (North Melbourne: Spinifex, 2015)
 The Kindness of Birds (North Melbourne: Spinifex, 2021)

Awards
Among her awards are:

Australian Classical Music Award for Best Vocal/Choral Work of the Year for Daragang Magayon Cantata (2007)
Gawad Pambansang Alagad ni Balagtas (National Balagtas Award: a lifetime award for author's poetry and prose in English, Pilipino, Bikol) from the Unyon ng Manunulat ng Pilipinas (Union of Philippine Writers) (2006)
Gintong Aklat Award (Golden Book Award: Philippine publishers' award) for Banana Heart Summer (2006)
Australian Literature Society Gold Medal for Banana Heart Summer (2006)
Nomination: Best in Foreign Language in Fiction from the Manila Critics' Circle for Banana Heart Summer (2006)
Judges' Choice Award, Bumbershoot Bookfair, Seattle Arts Festival for The Kissing (collection of short stories published as White Turtle in Australia and the Philippines) (2001)
Arts Queensland Steele Rudd Australian Short Story Award (for the Best Published Collection of Australian Short Stories, joint winner) for White Turtle (2000)
Philippine National Book Award for Fiction (Joint winner) from the Manila Critics' Circle for White Turtle (2000) 
NSW Ministry for the Arts Writers' Fellowship for novel in progress, Fish-Hair Woman (2000)
Canberra Writing Fellowship jointly from the Australian National University, the University of Canberra, and the Australian Defence Force Academy (2000)
Prix Italia (international award) for Rita's Lullaby (radio play) (1998)
Australian Writers' Guild Award (AWGIE) for Rita's Lullaby (1998)
Pamana Philippine Presidential Award for achievement in the arts (for Filipino expatriates) (1998)
Shortlist: The Age Poetry Book of the Year Award for Summer Was a Fast Train Without Terminals (collection of poems) (1998)
Winner, Out of the Ashes Trans-Tasman Short Story Competition for White Turtle (short story) (1998)
Commended: National Short Story Competition, Society of Women Writers for The Sadness Collector (short story) (1998)
Joint winner, ABC Radio National's 'Books & Writing Short Story Competition' for The Tongue (also known as The Parable of Illawarra Street) (1997)
Ian Reed Foundation Prize for Radio Drama for Rita's Lullaby (1995)
Carlos Palanca Memorial Award in Literature (Philippine national award), Honourable Mention for Ms. Serena Serenata (one-act play) (1995)
Gawad Cultural Centre of the Philippines (national award for poetry in Filipino) for Mula Dulo Hanggang Kanto ('From End to Corner', collection of poems) (1990)
Likhaan Award for Daragang Magayon and other poems, University of the Philippines Writers' Workshop (1990)
Carlos Palanca Memorial Award in Literature, Second Prize for Lupang di Hinirang: Kuwento at Sikreto ('Land Not Dearest: Story and Secret', collection of poems in Filipino) (1989)
Carlos Palanca Memorial Award in Literature, joint winner, First Prize for Peopleness (collection of poems in English) (1987)

References

Sources
 Biography
Dr Merlinda Bobis

External links
covenant animation of poem
Food, Love and other Engagements
Merlinda Bobis in conversation
Re-Inventing the Epic

1959 births
Living people
Australian women novelists
Filipino emigrants to Australia
Filipino women short story writers
Filipino short story writers
Australian women short story writers
Australian women poets
Filipino women novelists
Filipino novelists
English-language writers from the Philippines
20th-century Australian novelists
University of Wollongong alumni
20th-century Australian women writers
People from Legazpi, Albay
20th-century Australian short story writers